Charles Henry "Hank" Gremminger (September 1, 1933 – November 2, 2001) was an American football player, a defensive back in the National Football League for 11 seasons. He played ten seasons for the Green Bay Packers (1956–1965) and one for the Los Angeles Rams in 1966.

Early years
Born in Windthorst, Texas, Gremminger was raised in Weatherford and graduated from Weatherford High School in 1952. He played fullback in college at Baylor University in Waco.

Pro football
Gremminger was selected in the seventh round of the 1956 NFL draft by the Packers. Head coach Vince Lombardi arrived in 1959 and Gremminger was part of three NFL championship teams in 1961, 1962, and 1965.

In 1966, Gremminger was traded to the Dallas Cowboys in June but left during the first week of training camp. He was also with the expansion Atlanta Falcons before being named to the roster of the Los Angeles Rams in late October.

He was named to the Green Bay Packers Hall of Fame in 1976.

After football
Back in Texas, Gremminger was a contractor and later worked in the banking and insurance business and was a county commissioner in Parker County.

Death
Gremminger died at age 68 of cardiac arrest in Weatherford.

References

External links

 
 

1933 births
2001 deaths
American football cornerbacks
Baylor Bears football players
Green Bay Packers players
Los Angeles Rams players
People from Windthorst, Texas
Players of American football from Texas